Loneliness is a complex and usually unpleasant emotional response to isolation or lack of companionship.

Loneliness may also refer to:
 "Loneliness" (short story), a short-story by Charles Bukowski
 Loneliness (album), a 2009 album by Evan Yo
 Loneliness, a 1988 album by Sanchez
 "Loneliness" (song), a song by the German DJ Tomcraft
 "Loneliness", a song by Helen Reddy from Free and Easy
 "Loneliness", a song by Flobots from The Circle in the Square
 "Loneliness", a song by Robert Forster from Warm Nights

See also
 Lonely (disambiguation)
 Lonely Is the Night (disambiguation)
 Lonely Night (disambiguation)
 Lonely Nights (disambiguation)